Oru Murai Vanthu Parthaya is a 2016 Indian Malayalam film directed by Sajan K Mathew. Starring Unni Mukundan, Sanusha and Prayaga Martin. it narrates the story of a spirit (Prayaga) entering a youngster's (Mukundan) life to avenge her own death. Produced by Kokers Films, it was released on 27 May 2016. The title is derived from one of the famous song in the movie, Manichitrathazhu.

Plot
Prakashan is an electrician who is a compassionate wrestler in Mallapuram village. Hailing from a family that follows tradition and superstitions, his mother Sushila often consults with an astrologer Manoj about Prakashan's marriage. Manoj knows about Prakashan's interest with Ashwathy. Manoj's friends Kochukuttan, Kuriachan, Sankunni and Shivan help Prakashan in this matter.

The village's wrestling champion Kunjachan challenges Prakashan to fight. He happens to meet Parvathy while returning home. She pleads him for a place to stay that night since her relatives are not available. Prakashan brings Parvathy to his house. His mother started treating Parvathy as her "daughter-in-law" though Prakashan narrated the truth. As days passed, he falls in love with her. Eventually, Prakashan defeats the wrestling champion Kunjachan. While proposing his love to her, Prakashan is shocked to know that Parvathy is a ghost and his friends also confirm the same.

Palani Ashan, a renowned tantric expert found that Prakashan and Parvathy were lovers in the past life. His past life father (who is Manoj's friend Shivan in this life) killed her through his aide. She tries to exact revenge on the persons who killed her.

After that, Parvathy insists Prakashan to marry Aswathy. Prakashan & Aswathy get married. Parvathy forgives her killer and leaves without completing her revenge.

Cast

Music

Box office
The film was hit at boxoffice collecting 8 crores and completed 25 days in its theatrical run. The film grossed 1.27cr in its opening weekend.

References

2010s Malayalam-language films